Norbert Denef (born May 5, 1949 in Delitzsch, Germany) is a German victim of sexual abuse in the Roman Catholic church.

Life 

Denef was abused in his hometown Delitzsch between the ages of 10 and 16 by a priest, and from 16 to 18 by the parish's organist. The first offender, Alfons Kamphusmann (1924–1998), had been a priest since 1952. He worked in Droyßig, Delitzsch, Nordhausen, Langenweddingen, Hecklingen, Wittenberg Piesteritz and Niedertiefenbach (Diocese of Limburg). He retired in 1990 and died eight years later. The second offender, an organist and choir leader of the parish, retired and was never sued.

Denef lived on quietly, became the technical manager of the theater in Rüsselsheim, a husband and father of two children. He suppressed the memory of his past. The first offender officiated at his wedding. At the age of 40, Denef had a breakdown. After that he had to learn to speak about its history, beginning in November 1993 with his family of origin. He was offered compensation from the Diocese of Magdeburg in 2003, but refused the obligation to keep secrecy. In 2005 he received 25.000 Euro. Denef is believed to be the first victim in Germany who obtained compensation from the Roman Catholic church for sexual abuse in childhood.<ref>Peter Wensierski: Verirrte Hirten, Der Spiegel, December 2005]</ref>

In 2007 Denef published an autobiography: “Ich wurde sexuell missbraucht”. He still suffers from the impacts of the crime in his childhood and youth such as depression and posttraumatic stress disorder.Antje Hildebrandt: Ein Pfarrer vergriff sich über Jahre hinweg an Norbert Denef. Das Opfer leidet noch heute. In: Märkische Allgemeine, 5. Februar 2010 (online) Denef submitted a petition at the German Bundestag in 2008 to remove the statute of time limitations on child sexual abuse cases to file a lawsuit. It was refused. Denef is appealing the European Court of Human Rights now.Barbara Hans: Scham fressen Seele auf. In: Der Spiegel, 12. Februar 2010 (online) In December 2009 Denef visited the parish church St. Marien in Delitzsch, but did not achieve a dialog. He left an open letter at the door of the church.

Denef founded the Network of Victims of Sexual Violence, named NetzwerkB for short, in April 2010 and became its speaker. During the Ecumenical Church Conference in Germany in May 2011, Denef interrupted the abuse debate in front of some thousand visitors. He criticed the podium's members for talking about victims, but not with them. Bishop Stephan Ackermann, chairman of the German bishop conference, said: “I am frightened about the development of the event. The man is right: We speak about institution. I have the feeling that the victims got out of the focus.”Ein-Mann-Demo bei Diskussionsrunde. Missbrauchsopfer provoziert Eklat auf Kirchentag. In: Spiegel online, 14. Mai 2010 (online)Matthias Kamann: Missbrauch ist ungewollt das Thema Nummer 1. In: Die Welt, 14. Mai 2010 (online)Missbrauchsopfer stürmt Podium. In: Hamburger Abendblatt, 15. Mai 2010 (online)ARD Tagesschau: Missbrauchsdebatte auf dem Kirchentag. In: ARD, 14. Mai 2010Matthias Kamann: Kritik an Geistlichen gilt noch immer als Majestätsbeleidigung. In: Die Welt, 15. Mai 2010 (online)

As a speaker for NetzwerkB Denef protested against the nonparticipation of victims at a series of conferences on sexual child abuse organized by the Cabinet of Germany in Berlin in autumn 2010. He complained that there was too much talk and too little was done.Peter Hanack: Missbrauch: „Das Gesetz schützt die Täter“ In: Frankfurter Rundschau, 6. Januar 2011 (online) In December 2010, members of Survivors Network of those Abused by Priests (SNAP), including Denef, demonstrated at a meeting of cardinals in the Vatican against the too-careful treatment of clergyman who abused children. The police ejected them from Saint Peter's Square.

In 2012 NetzwerkB demonstrated on the Pariser Platz concerning the Pope's visit of Germany.

On December 6, 2011 Denef spoke at the SPD congress. The party voted concordantly for abolishing the statutes of legal limitations for child abuse.

On June 8, 2012 Norbert Denef started a hunger strike, as the SPD was not willing to act to abolish the statutes of legal limitations for child abuse.Scharbeutzer will mit Hungerstreik die Bundesrepublik bezwingen. In: Lübecker Nachrichten, 9. Juni 2012 (online)Hungerstreik in Scharbeutz: Jetzt schaltet sich Stegner ein. In: Lübecker Nachrichten, 15. Juni 2012 (online )Evelyn Finger: Ein Mann macht Ernst. In: Die Zeit, 21. Juni 2012 (online)

 denefhoop 

 

In 2016 Denef developed tires from Leonardo da Vinci's Vitruvian Man in different diameters; the movements with the tires named denefhoop serve the meditation as well as the rhythmic gymnastics.

 Works 

 Ich wurde sexuell missbraucht. Starks-Sture, München 2007, .
 Beschwerde gemäß Artikel 34 der Europäischen Menschenrechtskonvention und Artikel 45 und 47 der Verfahrensordnung des Europäischen Gerichtshofs für Menschenrechte gegen die Bundesrepublik Deutschland, 24. Februar 2009.'' ([http://norbert.denef.com/Beschwerde_12805_09.pdf online, pdf file; 267 kB)

References

External links 

 NetzwerkB
 denefhoop

1949 births
Living people
People from Delitzsch
Catholic Church sexual abuse scandals in Germany
Violence against men in Europe